Dendrobium tozerense, commonly known as the white gemini orchid, is an epiphytic or lithophytic orchid in the family Orchidaceae. It has thin, wiry stems, stiff leaves and pairs of star-shaped, white flowers. It grows in rainforest in tropical North Queensland, Australia.

Description
The side lobes are erect, rounded triangular and the middle lobe has a blunt tip and crinkled edges. Flowering occurs sporadically throughout the year.

Taxonomy and naming
Dendrobium tozerense was first formally described in 1977 by Bill Lavarack from a specimen collected from Tozer's Gap on Cape York Peninsula and the description was published in the journal Austrobaileya.

Distribution and habitat
The white gemini orchid grows on trees and rocks in rainforest and on cliffs near waterfalls on some Torres Strait Islands and south on the Cape York Peninsula to the Iron Range and Tully.

References

tozerense
Orchids of Queensland
Orchids of New Guinea
Epiphytic orchids
Plants described in 1977